The Lanyu Power Plant is a fuel-fired power plant in Yuren Village, Orchid Island, Taitung County, Taiwan. It is the only power plant on Orchid Island.

Technical specification
The power plant uses 15,000 liter of diesel fuel daily to generate electricity. It has two units of 750,000 liter diesel storage tanks.

See also

 List of power stations in Taiwan
 Electricity sector in Taiwan

References

1982 establishments in Taiwan
Buildings and structures in Taitung County
Energy infrastructure completed in 1982
Oil-fired power stations in Taiwan